This is a list of players, past and present, who have been capped by their country in international football whilst playing for Union Sportive Médina d'Alger. a further 5 nations have fielded USM Alger players in their international sides. and the first player from the team to participate in the African Cup was Boubekeur Belbekri in 1968 and the first goal scored by an Al Ittihad player was Billel Dziri in 1996 against Burkina Faso, The largest number of players in one tournament was in 1998 with the participation of four namely Meftah, Ghoul, Zeghdoud and Hamdani all of them defenders, In the Olympic games Abderrahmane Derouaz is the first to participate in the 1980 Moscow tournament and also in 2004 Malian Mamadou Diallo participated as the first foreigner from USM Alger in this Competition, after 36 years of absence the Algeria national under-23 football team qualified for Football at the 2016 Summer Olympics and among the squad's list are five players Abdellaoui, Benguit, Benkhemassa, Darfalou and Meziane.  In the FIFA World Cup the only player to participate was the goalkeeper Mohamed Lamine Zemmamouche in 2014. On January 3, 2023, Madjid Bougherra unveiled the list of 28 players who will represent Algeria at the 2022 African Nations Championship, including nine players from USMA, Belaïd, Loucif, Radouani, Baouche, Chita, Djahnit, Meziane, Mahious and Ait El Hadj, Two-thirds of Algeria's roster is made up of players from CR Belouizdad and USM Alger.

Players

Algerien players

Foreign players

Players in international competitions

African Cup Players
  
 
 
1968 African Cup
  Boubeker Belbekri
 
1980 African Cup
  Abderrahmane Derouaz
  Smaïl Slimani

1996 African Cup
  Billel Dziri
  Azzedine Rahim
  Nacer Zekri

1998 African Cup
  Mahieddine Meftah
  Tarek Ghoul
  Mounir Zeghdoud
  Fayçal Hamdani

2000 African Cup
  Mahieddine Meftah
  Mounir Zeghdoud

2002 African Cup
  Mahieddine Meftah
  Mounir Zeghdoud
  Billel Dziri

2004 African Cup
  Salim Aribi
  Hocine Achiou
  Hichem Mezaïr

2011 African Nations
  Nacereddine Khoualed

2012 African Cup
  Abdoulaye Maïga

2013 African Cup
  Saad Tedjar

2017 African Cup
  Mohamed Benyahia
  Mohamed Rabie Meftah

World Cup Players

 
World Cup 2014
  Mohamed Lamine Zemmamouche

Olympic Players

 
1980 Summer Olympics
  Abderrahmane Derouaz
 
2004 Summer Olympics
  Mamadou Diallo

 
2016 Summer Olympics
  Ayoub Abdellaoui
  Raouf Benguit
  Mohammed Benkhemassa
  Oussama Darfalou
  Abderrahmane Meziane

African Nations Championship Players

 
2011 African Championship
  Nacereddine Khoualed
 
2022 African Championship
  Zineddine Belaïd
  Haithem Loucif
  Saâdi Radouani
  Houari Baouche
  Oussama Chita
  Akram Djahnit
  Abderrahmane Meziane
  Aymen Mahious
  Mohamed Ait El Hadj

References

External links
FIFA.com
DzFoot
web.archive.org
National Football Teams

USM Alger
 
USM Alger international
Association football player non-biographical articles
Lists of international association football players by club